This article lists pubs owned by JD Wetherspoon which are located in the county of Hampshire, United Kingdom. As of April 2021, there were 27 Wetherspoon's pubs in Hampshire.

References

JD Wetherspoon